The Campeonato Internacional de Verano 2009, also known by the sponsored name Copa Bimbo, was the inaugural Campeonato Internacional de Verano, an exhibition international club football competition featuring four clubs from Uruguay and Brazil. It was played in Montevideo, Uruguay at the Estadio Centenario from 17 to 21 January 2009. It was won by Brazilian club Cruzeiro, who defeated Uruguayan side Nacional in the final.

Bracket

Matches

Semi-finals

Third place

Final

Scorers

3 goals
  Diego Tardelli (Atlético Mineiro)

2 goals
  Ramires (Cruzeiro)

1 goal
  Carlos Alberto (Atlético Mineiro)
  Éder Luis (Atlético Mineiro)
  Araújo (Atlético Mineiro)
  Elicarlos (Cruzeiro)
  Fernandinho  (Cruzeiro)
  Soares (Cruzeiro)

1 goal (cont.)
  Thiago Ribeiro (Cruzeiro)
  Wellington Paulista (Cruzeiro)
  Adrián Romero (Nacional)
  Alexander Medina (Nacional)
  Sergio Blanco (Nacional)
  Carlos Bueno (Peñarol)
  José María Franco (Peñarol)

Own goal
  Renan (Atlético Mineiro) for (Cruzeiro)

External links
Copa Bimbo - 2009 (www.campeoesdofutebol.com.br) 

2009
2009 in Brazilian football
2008–09 in Uruguayan football